Jordan Pierre-Gilles (born May 24, 1998) is a Canadian short-track speed skater.

Career
Pierre-Gilles made his World Cup debut in the 2019–2020 season, helping Canada to a bronze medal in the mixed relay at the Shanghai stop and gold in the men's 5000 metres relay at the last stop in Dordrecht.

Pierre-Gilles made his World Championships debut at the 2021 World Short Track Speed Skating Championships. Pierre-Gilles followed this up with a third-place finish at the Canadian Championships in August 2021, allowing him to be named to the Canadian team for the upcoming World Cup season.

On January 18, 2022, Pierre-Gilles was named to Canada's 2022 Olympic team. Pierre-Gilles won a gold medal as part of Canada's team in the 5000 m relay event.

References

External links

1998 births
Living people
French Quebecers
Canadian male short track speed skaters
Sportspeople from Sherbrooke
Short track speed skaters at the 2022 Winter Olympics
Olympic short track speed skaters of Canada
Medalists at the 2022 Winter Olympics
Olympic gold medalists for Canada
Olympic medalists in short track speed skating
World Short Track Speed Skating Championships medalists
21st-century Canadian people